Soon Mustafa bin Karim (born 22 May 1963) is a Malaysian field hockey player. He competed at the 1984 Summer Olympics and the 1992 Summer Olympics.

References

External links
 

1963 births
Living people
Malaysian male field hockey players
Olympic field hockey players of Malaysia
Field hockey players at the 1984 Summer Olympics
Field hockey players at the 1992 Summer Olympics
Place of birth missing (living people)